Sir William Allan Davis, GBE (19 June 1921 – 14 August 1994) was Lord Mayor of London for 1985 to 1986.

References 
 https://www.ukwhoswho.com/view/10.1093/ww/9780199540891.001.0001/ww-9780199540884-e-172024

1921 births
1994 deaths
Knights Grand Cross of the Order of the British Empire
20th-century lord mayors of London
Royal Naval Volunteer Reserve personnel of World War II